Chickasha High School is located in Chickasha, Oklahoma, United States. For the 2021-2022 school year, the school had an enrollment of 680 with 48 teachers.

History 
Chickasha Public Schools were established in the 1890s.  In his book, Chickasha...A Journey Back in Time, Irvin Munn quotes Mrs. Joe Dews as reporting that school in Chickasha was held in a store on Main Street with Eugene Hamilton, a lawyer, as teacher. Munn later says the first graduating class was in 1903.  It consisted of two members, Lousie Murphy and W. P. Latting.  Mr. W. A. Delzell was the first superintendent of schools in Chickasha, and after the town was classified as a First Class City in 1901, four brick school buildings were built.  The high school building was completed in 1909.

Lincoln School was established in 1941, consolidating with Chickasha High School in 1959.  Lincoln School remained an elementary school with grades 1-9 until 1965.  St. Joseph's Academy, associated with the Catholic Church, closed in 1967.  With that closure, Chickasha High School became the only public or private high school in the city limits.  In her book, Trails, Rails, and School Tales, author Gwen Jackson quotes two sources that Chickasha was "one of the leading school systems in Oklahoma."

Chickasha High School has primarily occupied two locations: 1000 South 9th Street where the current Middle School is located and, in 1968, the current site of Chickasha High School was established, 101 N. John P. Cowan Ave formerly known as Borden Park.  Grades 9 through 12 are currently housed at this location.  After several unsuccessful attempts to pass bond issues, in 2003, the Chickasha High School Activity Center was completed.  It houses the Basketball Arena which contains the Harly Day Basketball Court and the Chickasha High School Auditorium.  In 2007, the High School itself was renovated to its current structure.  The Stage Building was converted to a Freshman Center.

In 2013, Advanced-Ed, formerly known as North Central Accreditation, awarded Chickasha High School with 100 years of continuous accreditation.

Programs
As well as the traditional curriculum options, Chickasha High School has an associated alternative education program, Quality Academy, which was housed off campus at the former Southwest Elementary School. It is currently on the main campus. CHS also has an educational farm.

Awards and recognition 

Named by U.S. News & World Report as one of “America’s Best High Schools” in 2005, 2006, 2008
2010 Bronze medal school named by U.S. News & World Report
2012 Governor of Oklahoma ACE Award

Notable alumni 

Chet Allen (actor) graduated in 1945
Stephen Alexander (NFL) graduated in 1994
Ada Lois Sipuel Fisher (Civil Rights Activist) graduated in 1941 from Lincoln High School which consolidated with CHS in 1959
Laud Humphreys, sociologist
Scott Meachum (State Treasurer) graduated in 1981
A. Lee Mullican (artist) graduated in 1932
Wallis Ohl (Bishop, Episcopal church) graduated in 1961
Sam Rayburn (NFL) graduated in 1999
Jami Smith (religious singer and songwriter) graduated in 1988
Bill Wallace (Author of children’s books) graduated in 1965
Susan Winchester (Speaker Pro Tempore of Oklahoma State House) graduated in 1968

State titles 

18 total
Baseball 1966, 2002
Boys Basketball  1953, 1955, 1963
Girls Basketball  1984
Cheerleading  2006
Boys Golf  1972, 1991
Boys Soccer  1995, 1996, 1999, 2002
Girls Soccer  1998
Boys Tennis  1959
Archery 2015
Softball 2014,2015

References

External links
 www.ossaa.com Oklahoma Secondary Schools Activities Association

Public high schools in Oklahoma
Education in Grady County, Oklahoma